Wolf Island is a river island on the Tennessee River in Hardin County, Tennessee.

Wolf Island has the name of a pioneer settler.

References

Geography of Hardin County, Tennessee
River islands of Tennessee